Charles (Chuck) William Groetsch (born February 15, 1945, in New Orleans) is an American applied mathematician and numerical analyst.

Education and career
Groetsch graduated from the University of New Orleans with B.S. in 1966 and M.S. in 1968. He was from 1966 to 1968 an engineer and applied mathematician in Boeing's  Space Division, Launch Systems Branch. In 1971 he received his PhD in mathematics from Louisiana State University in 1971. At the University of Cincinnati he was an assistant professor from 1971 to 1975, an associate professor from 1976 to 1981, and a full professor from 1981 to 2006. There he was head of the department of mathematical sciences from 1985 to 1990. At The Citadel, the Military College of South Carolina, he was the founding dean of the School of Science and Mathematics from 2006 to 2011 and is the Citadel Distinguished Professor of Mathematical Science since 2011.

He has held visiting positions at several universities. He has given invited lectures at 18 different international symposia. He was the co-editor of the Journal of Integral Equations & Applications from 2002 to 2008. He was on the editorial boards of SIAM Review from 1992 to 1996 and the Journal of Mathematical Analysis & Applications from 1996 to 2005. He is on the editorial boards of Numerical Functional Analysis and Optimization since 1986, the Electronic Journal of Differential Equations since 1992, the Journal of Integral Equations & Applications since 1994–2008, the International Journal of Pure and Applied Mathematics since 2000, and the Electronic Journal of Mathematical and Physical Sciences since 2002.

His research deals with inverse and ill-posed problems, integral equations of the first kind, regularization theory, numerical analysis, approximation theory, applied mathematics, and history of mathematics. He is the author or co-author of over 100 articles in refereed journals.

In 1994 Groetsch (and Dan Kalman, independently) received the Mathematical Association of America's George Pólya Award. In 2010 Groetsch was elected a fellow of the American Association for the Advancement of Science (AAAS). In 2010 two special issues (volume 22, issues 2 & 3) of the Journal of Integral Equations and Applications were dedicated to him in honor of his “fundamental contributions to the field of inverse problems.”

Selected publications

Articles
 Curtis Outlaw and C.W. Groetsch, Averaging iteration in a Banach space, Bulletin of the American Mathematical Society, 75 (1969), 430–432. 
 C.W. Groetsch, A nonstationary iterative process for nonexpansive mappings, Proceedings of the American Mathematical Society, 43 (1974), 155–158. 
 C.W. Groetsch, On existence criteria and approximation procedures for integral equations of the first kind, Mathematics of Computation 29 (1975), 1105–1108. 
 C.W. Groetsch, Representations of the generalized inverse, Journal of Mathematical Analysis and Applications, 49 (1975) 154–157.
 C.W. Groetsch and J.T. King, Extrapolation and the method of regularization for generalized inverses, Journal of Approximation Theory, 25 (1979), 233–248. 
 C.W. Groetsch, On the Kryanev-Lardy method for ill-posed problems, Mathematisches Nachrichten 96(1980), 27–31. 
 C.W. Groetsch, On a regularization-Ritz method for Fredholm equations of the first kind, Journal of Integral Equations 4 (1982), 1973–182. 
 C.W. Groetsch, Comments on Morozov's discrepancy principle, Improperly Posed Problems and their Numerical Treatment (G. Hämmerlin & K. Hoffmann, eds.), Birkhauser, Basel, 1983, pp. 97–104. 
 C.W. Groetsch, On the asymptotic order of accuracy of Tikhonov regularization, Journal of Optimization Theory and Applications 41 (1983), 293–298. 
 C.W. Groetsch and E. Schock, Asymptotic convergence rate for Arcangeli's method for ill-posed problems, Applicable Analysis 18 (1984), 175–182. 
 C.W. Groetsch and J. Guacaneme, Arcangeli's method for Fredholm equations of the first kind, Proceedings of the American Mathematical Society, 99(1987), 256–26l. 
 C.W. Groetsch and C.R. Vogel, Asymptotic theory of filtering for linear operator equations with discrete noisy data,  Mathematics of Computation 49 (1987), 499–506. 
 C.W. Groetsch and A. Neubauer, Regularization of ill-posed problems: Optimal parameter choice in finite dimensions, Journal of Approximation Theory 58(1989), 184–201. 
 C.W. Groetsch, Convergence analysis of a regularized degenerate kernel method for Fredholm integral equations of the first kind, Integral Equations and Operator Theory 13(1990), 67–75.
 C.W. Groetsch, Differentiation of approximately specified functions, American Mathematical Monthly 98(1991), 847–850. 
 C.W. Groetsch, Spectral methods for linear inverse problems with unbounded operators, Journal of Approximation Theory 70(1992), 16–28. 
 C.W. Groetsch and Otmar Scherzer, The optimal order of convergence for  stable  evaluation  of  differential operators, Electronic Journal  of  Differential Equations 4(1993), 1–12.
 C.W. Groetsch, The optimal order of accuracy in Vasin's method for differentiation of noisy functions, Journal of Optimization Theory and Applications 74(1992), 373–378. 
 A. Binder, H.W. Engl, C.W. Groetsch, A. Neubauer and Otmar Scherzer, Weakly closed nonlinear operators and parameter  identification in parabolic equations by Tikhonov regularization, Applicable Analysis 55(1995), 215–234. 
 C.W. Groetsch, Tartaglia's inverse problem in a resistive medium, The American Mathematical Monthly 103(1996), 546–551. 
 C.W. Groetsch, Halley's gunnery rule, The College Mathematics Journal 28(1997), 47–50.
 C.W. Groetsch, Lanczos' generalized derivative, The American Mathematical Monthly 105(1998), 320–326. 
 Martin Hanke and C.W. Groetsch, Nonstationary iterated Tikhonov regularization, Journal of Optimization Theory and Applications 98(1998), 37–53. 
 C.W. Groetsch, An iterative stabilization method for the evaluation of unbounded operators, Proceedings of the American Mathematical Society 134(2006), 1173–1181.

Books
 C.W. Groetsch, Generalized Inverses of Linear Operators: Representation and Approximation, Dekker, New York, 1977.  
 Charles Groetsch, Elements of Applicable Functional Analysis, Dekker, New York, 1980.  
 C.W. Groetsch, The Theory of Tikhonov Regularization for Fredholm  Equations  of  the  First Kind, Pitman, London, 1984.  
 J. Evans, C. W. Groetsch, & M. Walker, Fundamentals  of  Calculus: Applications  to  Managerial,  Social  and  Life Sciences, West, St. Paul, 1986.  
J. Evans, C. W. Groetsch, & M. Walker, An Introduction to Calculus: Methods and Applications, West, St. Paul, 1986.  
H.W. Engl and C.W. Groetsch (eds.), Inverse and Ill-Posed Problems, Academic Press, Boston, 1987.   2014 pbk reprint
 C.W. Groetsch and J. Thomas King, Matrix Methods and Applications, Prentice-Hall, Englewood Cliffs, 1988.  
 C.W. Groetsch, Inverse Problems in the Mathematical Sciences, Vieweg Verlag, Wiesbaden/Braunschweig, Germany, 1993.   2013 pbk reprint
 C.W. Groetsch, Inverse Problems in the Mathematical Sciences - Japanese translation by Kazuei Onishi, Kazumi Tanuma and Masahiro Yamamoto, Saiensu-sha, Tokyo, 1996. 
 C.W. Groetsch, Inverse Problems, Mathematical Association of America, Washington, D.C., 1999.  
 C.W. Groetsch, Inverse Problems – Japanese translation by Akira Kaneko, Science Press, Tokyo, 2002. .
 C.W. Groetsch, Inverse Problems – Mandarin Chinese translation by Jin Cheng, Yongji Tan and Jijun Liu,  Springer, Beijing, 2006. Co-published by Tsinghua University Press, Beijing.  
 C.W. Groetsch, Inverse Problems: Activities for Undergraduates, Cambridge University Press, 1999. 
 C.W. Groetsch, Stable Approximate Evaluation of Unbounded Operators, LNM1894, Springer-Verlag, Heidelberg & Berlin, Germany, 2007,

References

1945 births
Living people
20th-century American mathematicians
21st-century American mathematicians
Applied mathematicians
Numerical analysts
University of New Orleans alumni
Louisiana State University alumni
University of Cincinnati faculty
The Citadel, The Military College of South Carolina faculty